Bhor Garh is a census town in North West district in the Indian territory of Delhi.
It is a Saini majority village while Rajputs (Chauhans and Tomars) are slightly lesser than Sainis.

Demography
In the 2011 census, Bhor Garh had 1,765 houses with a population of 8,627, consisting of 4,815 males and 3,812 females. The population of children aged 0–6 was 1,276, making up 14.79% of the total population of the village. The average sex ratio was 792 out of 1000, which is lower than the state average of 868 out of 1000. The child sex ratio in the village was 815 out of 1000, which is lower than the average of 871 out of 1000 in the territory of Delhi.  There are 83.06% Hindus, 12.87% Muslims, 3.92% Sikhs, 0.10% Christians and 0.05% Buddhists residing in it. The total Scheduled Castes and Scheduled Tribes population in the town was 1,236 people and all were Scheduled Castes. There are no people of the Scheduled Tribe in the town.

Accessibility 
Its nearby towns are Shahpur Garhi (2.9 km), Alipur (6.7 km), Bawana (8.1 km) etc. 
Nearby hospitals include Satyawadi Raja Harish Chandra Hospital (4.1 km), There are two government aided schools out of which one is primary school and other is senior secondary school, both affiliated by CBSE. Nearby private schools and institutions are Lala Hans Raj Gupta ITI, Bharat Mata Saraswati Bal Mandir, L.K. International School etc.

Politics 
Sharad Chauhan of the Aam Aadmi Party is the incumbent MLA from Narela constituency after the 2015 Delhi Legislative Assembly election under which Bhor Garh falls.

Notable people of the village 
 Chandra Bhan Saini (Munim Ji) - Well known activist and reputed person of his time in the Bhor Garh and Narela town, also participated in Indian independence movement.

References

Cities and towns in North West Delhi district